The AP2-Coincident Domain mainly at the Carboxy-terminus, or ACDC domain, is a protein domain that occurs in proteins from apicomplexan parasites.

It is found exclusively in apicomplexan proteins that also contain AP2 (Apetala 2-integrase) DNA binding domains (ApiAP2 proteins). In 8 of 9 known examples in the malarial parasite Plasmodium falciparum it is near the carboxy terminus, with the remaining one being at the amino terminus. As yet, beyond its identification and the observation that it occurs only in ApiAP2 proteins, the function of the ACDC domain is unknown. Two proteins with the ACDC domain were found in the nucleus of P. falciparum, as detected by a proteomic method, suggesting a role in nuclear biology.

References 

Protein domains